Buttermilk Creek is a creek in the town of Petrolia, Lambton County, Ontario, Canada.

Course
Buttermilk Creek begins in a field north of Petrolia and travels  through the northwest of the town before reaching its mouth at the Stonehouse Drain in Lorne C Henderson Conservation Area. The Stonehouse Drain flows via Bear Creek and the North Sydenham and Sydenham Rivers into Lake St. Clair.

Buttermilk Creek is part of the St. Clair Region Conservation Authority's Lower Bear Watershed.

See also
List of rivers of Ontario

References

Sources

Rivers of Lambton County